James Marshall Moorsom (16 November 1837 – 26 March 1918) was a British Liberal Party politician.

Son of Vice-Admiral Constantine Moorsom and grandson of Admiral Robert Moorsom, who distinguished himself at the Battle of Trafalgar, he was elected at the 1892 general election as the Member of Parliament (MP) for Great Yarmouth in Norfolk, defeating the sitting Conservative MP Sir Henry Whatley Tyler.

Moorsom served only three years in the House of Commons, until his defeat at the 1895 general election.

Moorsom was father of Raisley Stewart Moorsom, whose daughter Sasha married the sociologist Michael Young, Baron Young of Dartington; their son is the journalist Toby Young.

References

External links 

1837 births
1918 deaths
Liberal Party (UK) MPs for English constituencies
UK MPs 1892–1895
Politics of the Borough of Great Yarmouth